In A World with No Shore, French writer Hélène Gaudy imagines the doomed 1897 Swedish expedition to the North Pole, known as Andrée's Arctic balloon expedition, from photographs found with the bodies of the explorersSalomon August Andrée, Knut Frænkel, and Nils Strindbergover 30 years after their deaths, in 1930.

Originally published as Un monde sans rivage by Actes Sud in 2019, this postmodern, historical fiction won the François Billetdoux Prize in 2020. It was translated into English by Stephanie Smee and published by Zerogram Press in 2022.

References

2019 French novels
French philosophical novels
Postmodern novels
Novels set in the Arctic
Novels set in Sweden
Actes Sud books